Asura punctilineata is a moth of the family Erebidae first described by Alfred Ernest Wileman and Richard South in 1919. It is found on Luzon, in the Philippines.

References

punctilineata
Moths of Asia